Breckenridge is a city in Stephens County, Texas, United States. The estimated population was 5,349 as of February 2021. It is the county seat of Stephens County.  The mayor is Bob Sims.

Breckenridge was a stop on the since defunct Wichita Falls and Southern Railroad, one of the properties of Frank Kell and Joseph A. Kemp  of Wichita Falls, Texas. The line was thereafter operated until 1969 by the Chicago, Rock Island and Pacific Railroad.

Former Texas State Representative Carl Isett of Lubbock (District 84) was born in Breckenridge in 1957.

Dallas Cowboys legend Gerald M. "Jerry" Tubbs was an honor graduate student and played center at Breckenridge High School. He was part of two Texas state-championship football teams in 1951 and 1952. He played in three high-school all-star games, and was a unanimous Texas All-State selection in 1952. In 1971, Tubbs was inducted into the Texas High School Football Hall of Fame.

History

The town of Breckenridge originated in 1854 as Picketville, either named after the structure of its early homes or after rancher Bill Pickett, who lived in the area at the time. In 1876, Stephens County was established, and its territory included Picketville. The town was renamed "Breckenridge" after former U.S. Vice President and Confederate Army General John C. Breckinridge, though with an altered spelling.

Breckenridge was a major oil producer in the early 1920s.  The population jumped from around 1000 to 5000 in under five years. 
Briefly, it was the home of legendary figure of the Old West, John "Doc" Holliday. Breckenridge's boomtown era was well documented by the hundreds of photographs of pioneer photographer Basil Clemons.

Geography

Breckenridge is located at  (32.756793, –98.905580).

According to the United States Census Bureau, the city has a total area of 4.2 sq mi (10.8 km2), of which 0.24% is covered by water.

Demographics

2020 census

As of the 2020 United States census, there were 5,187 people, 2,018 households, and 1,267 families residing in the city.

2000 census
As of the census of 2000,  5,868 people, 2,274 households, and 1,546 families were residing in the city. The population density was 1,412.8 people/sq mi (545.9/km2). The 2,776 housing units had an average density of 668.4/sq mi (258.3/km2). The racial makeup of the city was 83.88% White, 0.34% Native American, 0.46% Asian, 11.35% from other races, and 1.76% from two or more races. Hispanics or Latinos of any race were 20.64% of the population.

Of the 2,274 households, 36.5% had children under 18 living with them, 51.1% were married couples living together, 12.6% had a female householder with no husband present, and 32.0% were not families. About 29.2% of all households were made up of individuals, and 14.8% had someone living alone who was 65 older. The average household size was 2.55, and the average family size was 3.16.

In the city, the age distribution was 30.2% under 18, 8.5% from 18 to 24, 26.0% from 25 to 44, 20.0% from 45 to 64, and 15.3% who were 65  or older. The median age was 34 years. For every 100 females, there were 89.7 males. For every 100 females age 18 and over, there were 84.3 males.

The median income for a household in the city was $28,697, and for a family was $35,164. Males had a median income of $25,923 versus $20,467 for females. The per capita income for the city was $14,014. About 16.9% of families and 19.3% of the population were below the poverty line, including 26.9% of those under age 18 and 14.4% of those age 65 or over.

Education

The City of Breckenridge is served by the Breckenridge Independent School District.

Breckenridge High School's mascot is a Buckaroo (a cowboy riding a bucking horse). The junior high school's mascot is a Bronco. The school colors are green and white. 
The Breckenridge High School football team of 1958, coached by Emory Bellard, was voted the Ft. Worth Star Telegram team of the century. The Buckaroos are undefeated in six Class 3A State Football Championships, winning four times in 1951, 1952, 1954, and 1958 with ties in 1929 and 1959.  Breckenridge High School has also produced girls tennis state champions, girls golf state champions, FFA and 4-H state and national champions, and academic state champions over the past few decades.

In 2011, the U.S. Department of Education recognized Breckenridge Junior High School as a National Blue Ribbon School.

Breckenridge is also the home of a West Texas campus of the  Texas State Technical College System. Environmental science technology, construction management technology, computer-aided drafting and design, digital imaging and design, software and business accounting, associate degree nursing, chemical-dependency counseling, and health-information technology are some of the courses offered at the Breckenridge TSTC campus. TSTC partners with BHS and other Texas high schools to offer dual-credit courses.

Climate
The climate in this area is characterized by hot, humid summers and generally mild to cool winters.  According to the Köppen climate classification, Breckenridge has a humid subtropical climate, Cfa on climate maps.

Around 5:20 pm local time on April 9, 2008, three tornadoes, including two "sisters", were confirmed to have hit at least a portion of the town. Within the city limits, 15 citizens were reported as injured. Five buildings were destroyed, including the airport, which was a former Air Force training facility.

References

External links

 City of Breckenridge Chamber of Commerce Website
 https://www.breckenridgetx.gov/ City of Breckenridge Official Website
 http://www.smhtx.com Stephens Memorial Hospital Official Website

Cities in Texas
Cities in Stephens County, Texas
County seats in Texas